Krishnadhan Das is a member of 12th Tripura Legislative Assembly. He belongs to Bharatiya Janata Party and represented Bamutia (Tripura Vidhan Sabha constituency).

Criminal Case 

 Charges were pressed against Krishnadhan for voluntarily causing hurt to deter public servant from his duty under IPC section 332, punishment of criminal conspiracy under IPC section 120B, assault or criminal force to deter public servant from discharge of his duty under IPC section 353 and mischief causing damage to amount of fifty rupees under IPC section 427.
 In February 2020, a non-bailable warrant was issued against BJP MLA Krishnadhan Das.

Contoversy 

 In May 2022, BJP MLA from Tripura's Bamutia district, Krishnadhan Das had his dancing video become popular on social media. He was seen in the video enjoying the event and showing off his moves to the audience.

References

Tripura MLAs 2018–2023
Bharatiya Janata Party politicians from Tripura
Living people
1975 births